"Øve os på hinanden" ("Practice on each other" [1st. p. pl.]) is a song by Danish music duo Fyr & Flamme that represented Denmark in the in  Eurovision Song Contest 2021 in Rotterdam. It is the first time since  that a song sung entirely in Danish represented the country at Eurovision. The song topped the Danish singles chart, being the first Danish Eurovision entry to do so since "Only Teardrops" in 2013.

Eurovision Song Contest

The song was selected to represent Denmark in the Eurovision Song Contest 2021, after winning Dansk Melodi Grand Prix, the music competition that selects Denmark's entries for the Eurovision Song Contest. The semi-finals of the 2021 contest featured the same line-up of countries as determined by the draw for the 2020 contest's semi-finals. Denmark was placed into the second semi-final, held on 20 May 2021, and performed in the second half of the show. They failed to progress to the final of the contest.

Charts

Weekly charts

Year-end charts

References

2021 singles
Eurovision songs of 2021
Number-one singles in Denmark
Eurovision songs of Denmark